Robert Hoddle Driberg White (19 May 1838 – 20 October 1900) was an Australian politician.

He was born in Stroud to pastoral superintendent James Charles White and Sarah Elizabeth Hoddle. He was a junior bank clerk from 1857 to 1859, when he became an accountant for the Bank of New South Wales in Deniliquin. From 1864 to 1869 he worked at Toowoomba, but he had financial difficulty and was a land manager at Mudgee, Kyneton and Coonamble from 1869 to 1880. On 2 May 1863 he married Eliza Jane Cowper, a niece of Sir Charles Cowper; they had four children. In 1880 White inherited money and a half-share in some Melbourne property, and was able to enjoy a life of leisure. In 1882 he was elected to the New South Wales Legislative Assembly for Gloucester, serving until 1887. In 1888 he was appointed to the New South Wales Legislative Council, where he remained until his death at Callan Park in 1900.

References

 

1838 births
1900 deaths
Members of the New South Wales Legislative Assembly
Members of the New South Wales Legislative Council
19th-century Australian politicians